The Bimson Blacksmith Shop was constructed in 1893 by Alfred G. Bimson as the first blacksmith shop in Berthoud, Colorado, USA.  He designed and built the building out of native Lyons sandstone. The shop remained open until 1943.

The building is currently being used by the Berthoud Historical Society to house the Little Thompson Valley Pioneer Museum.

See also
National Register of Historic Places listings in Larimer County, Colorado

References

External links

Blacksmith shops
Commercial buildings on the National Register of Historic Places in Colorado
Commercial buildings completed in 1893
Buildings and structures in Larimer County, Colorado
National Register of Historic Places in Larimer County, Colorado